William French (26 September 1704 – 16 January 1785) was an Anglican priest, most notably  the Dean of Ardagh from 1769 until his death.
 
He was born in County Roscommon and educated at Trinity College Dublin. His daughter Elizabeth was the second wife of Joseph Leeson, 1st Earl of Milltown.

References

1704 births
1785 deaths
Alumni of Trinity College Dublin
18th-century Irish Anglican priests
Deans of Ardagh
People from County Roscommon